Ismail Sulemanji Khatri (12 August 1937 – 28 April 2014) was an Indian craftsman, especially known for his invention of the Bagh print, a part of the centuries-old hand block printing practice.

He started block printing having moved to Bagh in the 1950s. As well as using traditional blocks, some 200–300 years old, he had new blocks made with designs inspired by the jali patterns found locally and at the Taj Mahal. He improved upon the red and black dyes previously used, and developed new vegetable-based dyes. Success came particularly when he started printing on bed sheets, saris and fabrics.

Awards
Lifetime achievement awards for Handicrafts 2013
Received the 2010 Shilp Guru Award, the highest award of the Indian Craftsmanship.
National Award from former President of India Shri Gyani Zail Singh at the Vigyan Bhavan New Delhi in 1984.
State Award government of Madhya Pradesh 1978
State Santavna Award government of Madhya Pradesh 1976

References

Indian artisans
People from Dhar district
1937 births
2014 deaths